Eram (also Romanized as Āram) is a village in Harazpey-ye Gharbi Rural District, in the Central District of Mahmudabad County, Mazandaran Province, Iran. At the 2006 census, its population was 892, in 239 families.

References 

Populated places in Mahmudabad County